Saltmarsh is a surname. Notable people with the surname include:

Ian Saltmarsh (1901–1970), English cricketer
John Saltmarsh (clergyman) (died 1647), radical clergyman of the English Civil War
John Saltmarsh (historian) (1908–1974), historian and Fellow of King's College, Cambridge
Ron Saltmarsh American composer